Bicentennial Park may refer to:

Australia
 Bicentennial Park, Sydney Olympic Park at the Homebush Bay in Sydney, New South Wales
 Rockdale Bicentennial Park in the Sydney suburb of Rockdale
 Bicentennial Park South in the Sydney suburb of Rockdale
 Bicentennial Park (Darwin) in Darwin, Northern Territory

Mexico
 Bicentennial Park (Mexico City)

United States
 Bicentennial Park (Allentown), Pennsylvania
 Bicentennial Park (Columbus, Ohio)
 Bicentennial Park (Hillsboro, Oregon)
 Bicentennial Park (Miami), Florida, now Museum Park
 Bicentennial Park (Metromover station), now Museum Park station
 Bicentennial Park (Oklahoma City), Oklahoma
 Bicentennial Capitol Mall State Park, Nashville, Tennessee
 Bicentennial Greenbelt Park, Maryville, Tennessee

 Far North Bicentennial Park, Anchorage, Alaska